The Women from the Folies Bergères (German: Die Frauen von Folies Bergères) is a 1927 French-German silent film directed by Joe Francis and Max Obal and starring Claire Rommer, Carl Auen and Josephine Baker. It was shot at the Johannisthal Studios in Berlin. The film's sets were designed by the art director Hermann Warm.

Cast
 Claire Rommer
 Carl Auen 
 Josephine Baker
 Pépa Bonafé
 Hilde Jennings 
 Margarete Lanner 
 Marysa
 Original John Tiller Girls
 Gyula Szőreghy
 Das Trio Komarova-Korgine-Sergine
 Tygma

References

Bibliography 
 Lamprecht, Gerhard. Deutsche Stummfilme. Gesamtregister. Deutsche Kinemathek, 1970.
 Rège, Philippe. Encyclopedia of French Film Directors, Volume 1. Scarecrow Press, 2009.

External links 
 

1927 films
German silent feature films
French silent feature films
Films of the Weimar Republic
1920s French-language films
Films directed by Max Obal
Films directed by Joe Francis
Films set in Paris
German black-and-white films
1920s French films
Films shot at Johannisthal Studios